The Bosnia and Herzegovina national under-20 basketball team is the national representative for Bosnia and Herzegovina in international under-20 basketball competitions. They are organized and run by the Basketball Federation of Bosnia and Herzegovina. The team competes at the FIBA U20 European Championship.

FIBA U20 European Championship

See also
Bosnia and Herzegovina national basketball team
Bosnia and Herzegovina national under-18 and under-19 basketball team
Bosnia and Herzegovina national under-16 and under-17 basketball team

References

External links
Official website (in Bosnian)
FIBA profile

M U20
Men's national under-20 basketball teams